Rusty Goffe (born 30 October 1948) is an English actor, best known for his appearances in Willy Wonka & the Chocolate Factory, Star Wars Episode IV - A New Hope, and the Harry Potter franchise.

Early life
Goffe was born on 30 October 1948 in Herne Bay, Kent. He attended Sturry Secondary Modern School.

Career
Goffe appeared as an Oompa-Loompa in the 1971 version of Willy Wonka & the Chocolate Factory and as a Jawa in Star Wars Episode IV: A New Hope, among a few other aliens. He also appeared in the films Willow and Flash Gordon. He played Le Muff in the film History of the World Part I and also played Goober, a purple gremlin butler in the CBBC children's sketch show Stupid!

In 2002, Goffe played the lead role in A Kitten for Hitler, a film created by Ken Russell with the intention of making something as offensive as possible. Goffe played a Jewish child who is made into a lamp by Hitler. He is also notable for being the face of Ginsters.

Goffe is a member of the Grand Order of Water Rats.

Personal life
On April 24, 2019, Rusty married his girlfriend of over 30 years Sarah Goffe in Koh Samui. He has two children.

Filmography

Film

Television

Commercials
Adult Learning – The "Get Rid of Your Gremlins" Gremlin
Hygena Furniture
Lyons Maid Ice Cream
Ginsters Meat Pies
Heroquest Board Game
Battlemaster's Board Game
Red Dog Hot Dogs

Music videos
Monaco – "What Do You Want from Me?"

References

External links

 
 Rusty Goffe Homepage

1948 births
Living people
20th-century English male actors
21st-century English male actors
Actors with dwarfism
English male film actors
English male television actors
Male actors from Kent
People from Herne Bay, Kent